Wilhelm Genazino (22 January 1943 – 12 December 2018) was a German journalist and author. He worked first as a journalist for the satirical magazine pardon and for Lesezeichen. From the early 1970s, he was a freelance writer who became known by a trilogy of novels, Abschaffel-Trilogie, completed in 1979. It was followed by more novels and two plays. Among his many awards is the prestigious Georg Büchner Prize.

Career 
Born in Mannheim, Genazino studied German, philosophy and sociology at the Johann Wolfgang Goethe University in Frankfurt am Main in the 1960s. He worked as a journalist until 1965. During this time, he worked, for the satirical magazine pardon and co-edited the magazine Lesezeichen. Beginning in 1970 he worked as a freelance author. In 1977 he achieved a breakthrough as a serious writer with his trilogy Abschaffel. In 1990 he became a member of the Academy for Language and Poetry in Darmstadt. After living in Heidelberg for a long time, Genazino moved to Frankfurt in 2004. That same year he was awarded the Georg Büchner Prize, the most prestigious award for German literature.

Genazino died on 12 December 2018 after a short illness at the age of 75.

Works

Books 
 Laslinstrasse, 1965
 :
 Abschaffel, 1977
 Die Vernichtung der Sorgen, 1978
 Falsche Jahre, 1979
 Der Fleck, die Jacke, die Zimmer, der Schmerz, 1989 (The mark, the jacket, the room, the pain)
  Reinbek bei Hamburg 1990
 . Reinbek bei Hamburg 1994
 Die Kassiererinnen, 1998 (Road works ahead)
 , 2001 (An umbrella for one day, English title : The shoe tester of Frankfurt)
 , 2003 (A woman, a flat, a novel)
 Der gedehnte Blick, 2004 (The extended gaze)
 , 2005 (The foolishness of love)
 , Munich 2007 (Mediocre homesickness)
 , Munich 2009
 , 2011 (If we were animals)
 , Hanser, Munich 2014, 
 Außer uns spricht niemand über uns. Hanser, Munich 2016, 
 Kein Geld, keine Uhr, keine Mütze. Hanser, Munich 2018,

Play 
 , premiered Staatstheater Darmstadt in October 2005, Frankfurt 2003, Munich 2006 and Der Hausschrat. Munich 2006, Mülheim 2007, Theaterstücke

In translation 
 Ein Regenschirm für diesen Tag was translated to English by Philip Boehm as The Shoe Tester of Frankfurt, New York: New Directions, 2006, and to Chinese, French, Italian, Greek and Lithuanian.
 Eine Frau, eine Wohnung, ein Roman was translated into French, Spanish, Polish, Chinese, and Hebrew.

Translations of works by Genazino have also been published in Greek, Latvian and Russian.

Honours 

 Bremer Literaturpreis, 1990
 Solothurner Literaturpreis, 1995

 Literaturpreis der Bayerischen Akademie der schönen Künste, 1998
 Kranichsteiner Literaturpreis, 2001

 Georg Büchner Prize, 2004
 Kleist Prize, 2007

 Kassel Literary Prize for Grotesque Humor, 2013
 Goethe Plaque of the City of Frankfurt, 2014

Literature 
 Heinz Ludwig Arnold (ed.): Wilhelm Genazino. Edition Text + Kritik, München 2004, .
 Andrea Bartl,  (ed.): Verstehensanfänge. Das literarische Werk Wilhelm Genazinos. Wallstein, Göttingen 2011 (Poiesis. Standpunkte zur Gegenwartsliteratur 7), .
 Jonas Fansa: Unterwegs im Monolog. Poetologische Konzeptionen in der Prosa Wilhelm Genazinos. Königshausen & Neumann, Würzburg 2008, .
 Alexander Fischer: Wider das System: Der gesellschaftliche Aussteiger in Genazinos 'Ein Regenschirm für diesen Tag' und literarische Verwandte bei Kleist und Kafka. UBP, Bamberg 2012, .
 Alexander Fischer: Im existentiellen Zwiespalt. Wilhelm Genazinos Ein Regenschirm für diesen Tag vor dem Hintergrund existenzphilosophischer Konzepte. In: Bartl, Andrea/Klinge, Annika (ed.): Transitkunst. Studien zur Literatur 1890-2010. UBP, Bamberg 2012
 Winfried Giesen (ed.): Wilhelm Genazino – "Die Belebung der toten Winkel", Begleitheft zur Ausstellung 11. Januar – 25. Februar 2006, Universitätsbibliothek Frankfurt am Main. Frankfurt 2006, .
 Aktualisiertes Verzeichnis der unselbstständig erschienenen Primärliteratur Wilhelm Genazinos from 1961 to 2014, collected by  Winfried Giesen.
 Wilhelm Genazino – Sekundärliteratur from 1963 to 2014 collected by Winfried Giesen.
 Anja Hirsch: Schwebeglück der Literatur. Der Erzähler Wilhelm Genazino. Synchron Wissenschaftsverlag der Autoren, Heidelberg 2006, 
 Joachim Jacob: Schönheit, Literatur und Lebenskunst. Überlegungen zu Peter Handkes „Versuch über den geglückten Tag“ und Wilhelm Genazinos "Eine Frau, eine Wohnung, ein Roman" In: Susanne Krepold, Christian Krepold (ed.): Schön und gut? Studien zu Ethik und Ästhetik in der Literatur. Königshausen & Neumann, Würzburg 2008, pp. 185–199.
 Ulrich Klappstein: Ein Flaneur für diesen Tag. Eine lexikalische Annäherung an den Schriftsteller Wilhelm Genazino In: Hartmut Fischer (ed.): Flanieren - Gehen - Wandern. Northeim 2011.
 Christian Krepold: "... als sei das Ende des Menschen die einzige ordentliche Verrichtung". Altern, Melancholie und Komik bei Wilhelm Genazino und Italo Svevo. In: Andrea Bartl (ed.): Transitträume. Beiträge zur deutschsprachigen Gegenwartsliteratur. Wißner, Augsburg 2009 (Germanistik und Gegenwartsliteratur 4), pp. 55–101.
 Susanne Krepold, Christian Krepold: Literarische Selbstreflexion durch Lektüre. Wilhelm Genazino als Leser von Marguerite Duras. In: Steffen Buch, Álvaro Ceballos, Christian Gerth (ed.): Selbstreflexivität. 23. Forum Junge Romanistik (Göttingen, 30. Mai–2. Juni 2007). Romanistischer Verlag, Bonn 2008, pp. 107–124.
 Nils Lehnert: Wilhelm Genazinos Romanfiguren. Erzähltheoretische und (literatur-)psychologische Zugriffe auf Handlungsmotivation und Eindruckssteuerung. De Gruyter, Berlin 2018 (Deutsche Literatur. Studien und Quellen 30), .

References

External links 

 
 Sabrina Hennig: Wilhelm Genazino Literaturportal Bayern
 Wilhelm.Genazino Literatur Port
 
 Wilhelm Genazino Hanser
 Wilhelm Genazino commented links, Universitätsbibliothek of the FU Berlin
 Peter Mohr: Chronist des alltäglichen Wahnsinns / Zum 75. Geburtstag des Georg-Büchner-Preisträgers Wilhelm Genazino , 22 January 2018
 Wilhelm Genazino Stadtschreiberarchiv Bergen-Enkheim
 Wilhelm Genazino Ein großer Desillusionierungskünstler, obituary in Die Zeit, 14 December 2018

1943 births
2018 deaths
German male novelists
Kleist Prize winners
Georg Büchner Prize winners
Members of the Academy of Arts, Berlin
German male writers